Anorthosis Famagusta Futsal is the futsal team of Cypriot sports club Anorthosis Famagusta.

History

The Anorthosis Famagusta Futsal club was founded on a desire to produce a futsal squad that could regularly compete at the highest level, together with a commitment to introduce and accelerate the game's development in surrounding schools and communities.

2012
The club joined and competed in the Cypriot Futsal First Division from April 2012.
Within three years the part Futsal we accomplished since the third category climb to the first category of the Cyprus Futsal championships
Anorthosis finished third in the league table and managed to get the rise for the second category

2013
For the first time in the history of Anorthosis struggling in Division Two, at which point the second and advancing to the first category.

2014
For the first time in the history of Anorthosis struggling in the First Division Futsal Championship.

2015
For the first time in the history of Anorthosis struggling in the First Division Futsal Championship finishing in third position and reaching the Cup semifinal

2016
In 2016, Anorthosis took the 3rd place of Cypriot Futsal First Division, with 53 points, 11 points under the champion Apoel Nicosia. Also Anorthosis faced against Apoel Nicosia in the Cypriot Futsal Cup finals by losing 5–6 in Eleftheria Indoor Hall.

2017
Anorthosis Famagusta won the championship for the first time, beating Omonia by 2–0 in series [5-2 in Larnaca (home), 4–7 in Nicosia (away)]

Current squad
Last update: 7 October 2021

References

Futsal
Futsal clubs established in 2012
Futsal clubs in Cyprus
2012 establishments in Cyprus